German civil war may refer to:
 German Peasants' War (1524–1525)
 Schmalkaldic War (1546–1547)
 Second Schmalkaldic War (1552)
 Thirty Years' War (1618–1648)
 Austro-Prussian War (1866)
 The German Revolution (1918–1919)
 Beer Hall Putsch (1923)
 20 July plot (1944)